Two ships of the Royal Australian Navy (RAN) have been named HMAS Hawk:

 HMAS Hawk, formerly , an auxiliary patrol boat commissioned in 1940 and operating under the Hawk name from March until November 1945, when she was decommissioned
 , formerly HMS Gamston and HMS Somerlyton, was commissioned into the RAN in 1961, and decommissioned in 1972

Battle honours
Ships named HMAS Hawk are entitled to carry a single battle honour:
Malaysia 1964–66

See also
, several ships of the Royal Navy
, several ships of the United States Navy

References

Royal Australian Navy ship names